Tetsuo Katsuta   (born March 21, 1978) is a Japanese mixed martial artist. He competed in the Featherweight division.

Mixed martial arts record

|-
| Loss
| align=center| 7-5-2
| Makoto Ishikawa
| Decision (Unanimous)
| Shooto 2004: 1/24 in Korakuen Hall
| 
| align=center| 3
| align=center| 5:00
| Tokyo, Japan
| 
|-
| Draw
| align=center| 7-4-2
| Makoto Ishikawa
| Technical Draw
| Shooto: Wanna Shooto 2003
| 
| align=center| 1
| align=center| 1:22
| Tokyo, Japan
| 
|-
| Win
| align=center| 7-4-1
| Hideki Kadowaki
| Decision (Unanimous)
| Shooto: 3/18 in Korakuen Hall
| 
| align=center| 3
| align=center| 5:00
| Tokyo, Japan
| 
|-
| Loss
| align=center| 6-4-1
| Norifumi Yamamoto
| TKO (Punches)
| Shooto: Treasure Hunt 10
| 
| align=center| 1
| align=center| 2:45
| Yokohama, Kanagawa, Japan
| 
|-
| Draw
| align=center| 6-3-1
| Kazuhiro Inoue
| Draw
| Shooto: Treasure Hunt 8
| 
| align=center| 3
| align=center| 5:00
| Tokyo, Japan
| 
|-
| Loss
| align=center| 6-3
| Alexandre Franca Nogueira
| Submission (Guillotine Choke)
| Shooto: To The Top 8
| 
| align=center| 2
| align=center| 2:45
| Tokyo, Japan
| For Shooto Lightweight Championship
|-
| Win
| align=center| 6-2
| Alexandre Franca Nogueira
| Decision (Majority)
| Shooto: To The Top 4
| 
| align=center| 3
| align=center| 5:00
| Tokyo, Japan
| Non-Title Bout
|-
| Win
| align=center| 5-2
| Baret Yoshida
| Decision (Unanimous)
| Shooto: To The Top 1
| 
| align=center| 3
| align=center| 5:00
| Tokyo, Japan
| 
|-
| Win
| align=center| 4-2
| Hiroshi Umemura
| Decision (Unanimous)
| Shooto: R.E.A.D. 10
| 
| align=center| 2
| align=center| 5:00
| Tokyo, Japan
| 
|-
| Win
| align=center| 3-2
| Kazuhiro Inoue
| Decision (Unanimous)
| Shooto: R.E.A.D. 7
| 
| align=center| 2
| align=center| 5:00
| Setagaya, Tokyo, Japan
| 
|-
| Win
| align=center| 2-2
| Teruyuki Hashimoto
| Submission (Rear-Naked Choke)
| Shooto: R.E.A.D. 4
| 
| align=center| 1
| align=center| 4:29
| Setagaya, Tokyo, Japan
| 
|-
| Loss
| align=center| 1-2
| Anthony Hamlett
| Decision (Majority)
| SB 15: SuperBrawl 15
| 
| align=center| 2
| align=center| 5:00
| Honolulu, Hawaii, United States
| 
|-
| Win
| align=center| 1-1
| Tatsuya Sakurai
| Submission (Rear Naked Choke)
| Shooto: Gateway to the Extremes
| 
| align=center| 2
| align=center| 3:33
| Setagaya, Tokyo, Japan
| 
|-
| Loss
| align=center| 0-1
| Katsuya Toida
| Decision (Unanimous)
| Shooto: Gig '99
| 
| align=center| 2
| align=center| 5:00
| Tokyo, Japan
|

See also
List of male mixed martial artists

References

1978 births
Japanese male mixed martial artists
Featherweight mixed martial artists
Living people